Joseph Malongoane (born 17 March 1988) is a South African footballer who plays for Tshakhuma Tsha Madzivhandila F.C. in the Premier Soccer League. He was born in the village of Moletjie, Limpopo but grew up in Alexandra, Gauteng.

The skilful midfielder started his professional career on the books of Platinum Stars under the guidance of coach Steve Komphela. His career then led him to stints with AmaZulu, Orlando Pirates and Chippa United. At the start of the 2016/17 season, Molangoane re-united with coach Steve again when he committed to Amakhosi for two years.

Tight (as he is known by football fans) suffered a horrific injury when he broke his ankle playing against Free State Stars in August 2018. This saw him being ruled out for the rest of 2018.

In May 2019, Kaizer Chiefs announced that midfielder has extended his stay with the Soweto giants after signing a one-year contract extension with an option to extend.

In July 2020, TTM announced that they have signed Joseph together with Oupa Manyisa on two years contracts.

Honours
Orlando Pirates F.C.
Nedbank Cup: 2013-14
Marumo Gallants F.C.
Nedbank Cup: 2020-21

References

1988 births
Living people
South African soccer players
Association football midfielders
Platinum Stars F.C. players
AmaZulu F.C. players
Orlando Pirates F.C. players
Chippa United F.C. players
Kaizer Chiefs F.C. players
South African Premier Division players